Thiruvananthapuram (Trivandrum) is the capital city of Kerala, India. The city has the most number of schools, higher educational institutions, professional colleges and research institutes in Kerala.

This is a list of prominent colleges and other prominent higher educational institutes in Trivandrum:

Undergraduate Colleges 
 Indian Institute of Science Education and Research (IISER).
 Mahatma Gandhi College (MG College)
 Govt.Arts College, Trivandrum
 KNM Govt Arts and Science college Kanjiramkulam
 Govt College attingal
 Iqbal Collage Peringammala Trivandrum
 Sree Narayana College chempazhanthy Trivandrum
 Govt College Kariyavattom Trivandrum
 University College Trivandrum
 St. Xavier's College, Thumba
 VTM NSS College, Dhanuvachapuram
 College of Applied Science, Dhanuvachapuram
 Christ Nagar college, Maranalloor
 All Saints College, Trivandrum
 National College, Ambalathara
 Dr. Palpu College of Arts and Science, Pangode

Professional colleges

Architecture
College of Engineering, Trivandrum,Department of Architecture
 College of Architecture, Trivandrum, C.A.T

Engineering 
 Indian Institute of Space Science and Technology 
 College of Engineering, Trivandrum
 Government Engineering College Barton Hill
 Sree Chitra Thirunal College of Engineering, Pappanamcode, Trivandrum
 Rajadhani Institute of Engineering and Technology, Nagaroor, Attingal, Trivandrum
 Lourdes Matha College of Science and Technology, Kuttichal,Trivandrum
 ACE College of Engineering, Trivandrum
 College of Engineering, Attingal
 College of Engineering, Muttathara
 John Cox Memorial C.S.I Institute of Technology, Kannammoola
 Mar Baselios College of Engineering and Technology, Nalanchira
 University College of Engineering, Kariavattom (UCK)
 Mohandas College of Engineering & Technology, Anad , Nedumangad , Thiruvananthapuram (MCET)
 Sarabhai Institute of Science & Technology, Vellanadu, Thiruvananthapuram
 Heera College of engineering and Technology, Panavoor P.O., Nedumangadu, Trivandrum
 St.Thomas Institute for Science and Technology, Kattaikonam, Trivandrum
 Muslim Association College of Engineering
 Vidya Academy of Science and Technology Technical Campus, Kilimanoor

Music and arts 
 College of Fine Arts Trivandrum

Law 
 Government Law College, Thiruvananthapuram
 Kerala Law Academy Law College
 Mar Gregorios College of Law

Medical 
 Trivandrum Medical College
 SUT Academy of Medical Sciences, Vattappara
 Sree Chitra Thirunal Institute of Medical Sciences and Technology

Agriculture 
 College of Agriculture vellayani

Other institutes 
 Centre for Development Studies
Centre for Earth Science Studies
 The Oriental Research Institute & Manuscripts Library
 aims Medical/Engineering Training, Balaramapuram
 Keltron Knowledge Service Group (A Govt of Kerala Undertaking)
 IISER TVM

See also 
 Schools in Trivandrum

References

External links 
 https://web.archive.org/web/20070430055352/http://www.kerala.gov.in/dept_technicaleducation/
 https://web.archive.org/web/20070626175942/http://www.kerala.gov.in/dept_health/me_edu.htm
 http://www.kerals.com/kerala/kerala_colleges_and_univercities.htm
 http://www.sutcollegeofmedicine.com/
 http://vidyatcklmr.ac.in/

Thiruvananthapuram